"No Love (I'm Not Used to)" is a song performed by Kevon Edmonds, issued as a radio-only single from his debut solo album 24/7. Released in 1999, the song peaked at #25 on the Billboard R&B chart in 2000.

Chart positions

Weekly charts

Year-end charts

References

1999 singles
Kevon Edmonds songs
RCA Records singles
Songs written by Daryl Simmons
1999 songs